Honey Hill-Boyd's Neck Battlefield is a historic battlefield site located near Ridgeland, Jasper County, South Carolina.  The boundary encompasses the site of the American Civil War Battle of Honey Hill, November 30, 1864, as well as the Federal enclave on Boyd's Neck and other related areas of the Honey Hill campaign, November 29, 1864 to January 11, 1865. The Battle of Honey Hill was one of the three largest Civil War battles fought in South Carolina, and was one of the most notable Civil War engagements involving African American troops. The site includes the largely intact 1864 road network and extensive Civil War earthworks.

It was added to the National Register of Historic Places in 2004.

References

Archaeological sites on the National Register of Historic Places in South Carolina
Buildings and structures in Jasper County, South Carolina
National Register of Historic Places in Jasper County, South Carolina